Bleuler is a German language surname. It may refer to:

Eugen Bleuler (1857–1939), Swiss psychiatrist
Hermann Bleuler (1837–1912), Swiss engineer and army officer
Johann Heinrich Bleuler (1758–1823), Swiss painter
Johann Ludwig Bleuler (1792–1850), Swiss painter
Konrad Bleuler (1912–1992), Swiss physicist
Manfred Bleuler (1903–1994), Swiss physician and psychiatrist

German-language surnames
Surnames from nicknames
Swiss-German surnames